Rainbow Ranch is a 1933 American Western film directed by Harry L. Fraser and written by Harry L. Fraser and Phil Dunham. The film stars Rex Bell, Cecilia Parker, Bob Kortman, Harry Bowen, Henry Hall and Vane Calvert. The film was released on July 25, 1933, by Monogram Pictures.

Plot

Cast           
Rex Bell as Ed Randall
Cecilia Parker as Molly Burke
Bob Kortman as Marvin Black 
Harry Bowen as Train Passenger
Henry Hall as Judge
Vane Calvert as Martha Randall 
Gordon De Main as Sheriff 
Charles Haefeli as Johnny
George Nash as Pete
Jerome Storm as Sam
Tiny Sandford as Joe

References

External links
 

1933 films
1930s English-language films
American Western (genre) films
1933 Western (genre) films
Monogram Pictures films
Films directed by Harry L. Fraser
American black-and-white films
1930s American films